In mathematics, the dimension theorem for vector spaces states that all bases of a vector space have equally many elements. This number of elements may be finite or infinite (in the latter case, it is a cardinal number), and defines the dimension of the vector space.

Formally, the dimension theorem for vector spaces states that:

As a basis is a generating set that is linearly independent, the theorem is a consequence of the following theorem, which is also useful:

In particular if  is finitely generated, then all its bases are finite and have the  same number of elements.

While the proof of the existence of a basis for any vector space in the general case requires Zorn's lemma and is in fact equivalent to the axiom of choice, the uniqueness of the cardinality of the basis requires only the ultrafilter lemma, which is strictly weaker (the proof given below, however, assumes trichotomy, i.e., that all cardinal numbers are comparable, a statement which is also equivalent to the axiom of choice). The theorem can be generalized to arbitrary -modules for rings  having invariant basis number.

In the finitely generated case the proof uses only elementary arguments of algebra, and does not require the axiom of choice nor its weaker variants.

Proof

If  is finite, this results from the Steinitz exchange lemma. If  is finite, a proof based on matrix theory is also possible. 

Assume that  is infinite. If  is finite, there is nothing to prove. Thus, we may assume that  is also infinite. We have to prove that this leads to a contradiction. 

By Zorn's lemma, every linearly independent set is contained in a maximal linearly independent set .

Thus, every  can be written as a finite sum

The corresponding  can be expressed as a finite linear combination of s, which in turn can be expressed as finite linear combination of s, not involving . Hence  is linearly dependent on the other s, which provides the desired contradiction.

Kernel extension theorem for vector spaces
This application of the dimension theorem is sometimes itself called the dimension theorem. Let

be a linear transformation. Then

that is, the dimension of U is equal to the dimension of the transformation's range plus the dimension of the kernel. See rank–nullity theorem for a fuller discussion.

Notes

References

Theorems in abstract algebra
Theorems in linear algebra
Articles containing proofs